This article contains a list of power stations in Colombia. Hydroelectric power accounts for 70 percent of Colombia's generating capacity.

Coal
http://www.industcards.com/st-coal-colombia.htm

In service

Gas
Termobarranquilla S.A. (E.S.P) TEBSA || 918 MW ||    
https://tebsa.com.co/somos-tebsa/
https://web.archive.org/web/20140413193146/http://www.industcards.com/cc-colombia.htm

Hydroelectric

In service

Proposed or Under Construction

See also 

 List of power stations in South America
 List of largest power stations in the world

References

Colombia

Power stations